Oleksandr Tilte (born 10 April 1995) is a Ukrainian handball player for SPR Chrobry Głogów and the Ukrainian national team.

He represented Ukraine at the 2020 European Men's Handball Championship.

References

1995 births
Living people
Ukrainian male handball players
Sportspeople from Zaporizhzhia
ZTR players
21st-century Ukrainian people